Robert Henderson (December 19, 1904  Ann Arbor, Michigan - September 9, 1985  London, England) was an American actor. He was known for Superman (1978), Superman III (1983), and Phase IV (1974). 

He played an important role in the early career of Sean Connery. According to the Guardian's obituary of Connery: while he was touring as a chorus member in South Pacific "An American actor in the cast, Robert Henderson, gave him [Connery] a reading program that included all the plays of George Bernard Shaw, Oscar Wilde and Henrik Ibsen, along with the novels of Thomas Wolfe, Proust’s “Remembrance of Things Past” and Joyce's “Ulysses.”

Filmography

References

1904 births
1985 deaths
20th-century American male actors